William G. Boltz is a professor emeritus at the University of Washington and a scholar of manuscript study, philology, and textual criticism, known for his studies of the origin of the Chinese writing system.

Education and career 
William G. Boltz attended the University of California, Berkeley and obtained his B.A., M.A., and Ph.D. degrees in Oriental Languages in 1965, 1969, and 1974, respectively. At Berkeley, he studied Chinese language and linguistics from Professor Yuen Ren Chao（赵元任）, Chinese philology from Professor Peter A. Boodberg, Chinese linguistics from Professor Kun Chang, and Romance philology and linguistics from Professor Yakov Malkiel. He began working as a Professor of Classical Chinese in the Department of Asian Languages and Literature at the University of Washington, Seattle in 1981.

In 2022, The Seattle Times reported that the University of Washington had investigated Boltz for multiple accusations of sexual harassment of students spanning several decades. Boltz received coaching by the University after several of these incidents, as well as suspended merit pay increase for two years. He was permitted to continue to teach for the University. He is quoted in the Times describing his actions as "poor decisions and wrong choices." As of Fall, 2022, Boltz is no longer teaching at UW, and his information has been removed from the web page of the Department of Asian Languages and Literature.

Selected works
 Boltz, William G. (1994). The Origin and Early Development of the Chinese Writing System. New Haven, Conn.: American Oriental Society.

References

Living people
American sinologists
University of California, Berkeley alumni
University of Washington faculty
Year of birth missing (living people)